Holsthum is a municipality in the district of Bitburg-Prüm, in Rhineland-Palatinate, western Germany.

Sights 

 Roman villa
 Schloss Holsthum
 St. Rochus Chapel
 Old glassworks
 Military cemetery

References

Bitburg-Prüm